The 1983 Calder Cup playoffs of the American Hockey League began on April 5, 1983. The eight teams that qualified, four from each division, played best-of-seven series for Division Semifinals and Division Finals. The division champions played a best-of-seven series for the Calder Cup.  The Calder Cup Final ended on May 19, 1983, with the Rochester Americans defeating the Maine Mariners four games to zero to win the Calder Cup for the fourth time in team history.

Playoff seeds
After the 1982–83 AHL regular season, the top four teams from each division qualified for the playoffs. The Rochester Americans finished the regular season with the best overall record.

Northern Division
Fredericton Express - 98 points
Nova Scotia Voyageurs - 87 points
Maine Mariners - 86 points
Adirondack Red Wings - 77 points

Southern Division
Rochester Americans - 101 points
Hershey Bears - 85 points
New Haven Nighthawks - 84 points
Binghamton Whalers - 80 points

Bracket

In each round, the team that earned more points during the regular season receives home ice advantage, meaning they receive the "extra" game on home-ice if the series reaches the maximum number of games. There is no set series format due to arena scheduling conflicts and travel considerations.

Division Semifinals 
Note: Home team is listed first.

Northern Division

(1) Fredericton Express vs. (4) Adirondack Red Wings

(2) Nova Scotia Voyageurs vs. (3) Maine Mariners

Southern Division

(1) Rochester Americans vs. (4) Binghamton Whalers

(2) Hershey Bears vs. (3) New Haven Nighthawks

Division Finals

Northern Division

(1) Fredericton Express vs. (3) Maine Mariners

Southern Division

(1) Rochester Americans vs. (3) New Haven Nighthawks

Calder Cup Final

(S1) Rochester Americans vs. (N3) Maine Mariners

See also
1982–83 AHL season
List of AHL seasons

References

Calder Cup
Calder Cup playoffs